X-Ray Spectrometry is a bimonthly peer-reviewed scientific journal established in 1972 and published by John Wiley & Sons. It covers the theory and application of X-ray spectrometry. The current editor-in-chiefs are Johan Boman (University of Gothenburg) and Liqiang Luo (National Research Center of Geoanalysis).

Abstracting and indexing 
The journal is abstracted and indexed in:

According to the Journal Citation Reports, the journal has a 2020 impact factor of 1.488, ranking it 30th out of 43 journals in the category "Spectroscopy".

Notable articles 
The highest-cited articles from this journal are:

References

External links 
 

Chemistry journals
Wiley (publisher) academic journals
Publications established in 1972
English-language journals
Bimonthly journals
X-ray spectroscopy